The Putnam County League is non-football athletic conference whose eight members are located within Putnam County, Ohio.  The league is affiliated with the Ohio High School Athletic Association.

Members

At the junior high level, three more middle schools are added to the league:
 Glandorf Dragons
 Ottawa Titans
 Ottawa Sts. Peter and Paul Knights

Former member schools
Belmore
Blanchard Eagles (merged into Pandora-Gilboa in 1951)
Cloverdale (merged into Ottoville in 1930)
Crawfis College (merged into Blanchard 
Glandorf (merged into Ottawa-Glandorf)
Ottawa (merged into Ottawa-Glandorf)
Ottawa-Glandorf Titans (joined the Western Buckeye League in the spring of 1967.)
Ottawa Public
Ottawa SPPS
Palmer (merged into Miller City in 1941)
Pandora Fleetwings (merged into Pandora-Gilboa in 1951)
Vaughnsville Vikings (merged into Columbus Grove in 1962)

Putnam County League Championships

League championship notes
Golf champions were first determined in the fall of 1975.
Boys basketball champions were first officially declared in 1934-35 with the exception of 1942-43 due to World War II. The first Pandora High School boys basketball team won the first county title recorded, however it was before official declaration.
Girls basketball champions were first officially declared in 1934-35 and 1935–36, but not officially again until 1973-74.
Baseball champions were determined by division winners (West & East) in a title game from 1931-1942, 1946-1948, and 1953-1955.  A league tournament was used from 1943-1945, 1949-1952, and 1956-1964.  From 1965 on, they were determined by regular season PCL records.

See also
Ohio High School Athletic Conferences
OHSAA Northwest Region athletic conferences

References

Ohio high school sports conferences